The World of Soccer Cup, a association football friendly tournament, took place in the summer of 1977, hosted by Singapore and Australia.

Overview 

The tournament was the idea of English entrepreneur Reg Lambourne, Strata Travel owner Tom Lawrence and Red Star Belgrade FC Secretary General Dr Miroljub Stojkovic and consisted of two competitions. The first (also known as Metro 20th Anniversary Tournament) was a straight knock-out tournament in Singapore, and the second was a mini-league in which the top two teams would play in the final. The first trophy was won by Red Star Belgrade (FK Crvena zvezda) and the second by Celtic, and was the last ever trophy Jock Stein would ever lift for Celtic.

Teams that participated 

 Celtic FC Latchford, McGrain, Burns, Stanton, McDonald, Aitken, Wilson, Conn, Glavin, Edvaldsson, Lennox, Doyl, Kay (Manager Jock Stein)
 Red Star Belgrade Stojanović, Jelikić, Jovanović, Muslin, Bogićević, Novković, Nikolić, Petrović, Savić, Sušić, Filipović, Šestić, Lukić (Manager Gojko Zec)   
 Arsenal Rimmer, Rice, Nelson, Powling, O'Leary, Young, Brady, Hudson, Macdonald, Stapleton, Armstrong, Rix, Mathews (Manager Terry Neill) 
 A select XI from the host nation
 Australia Reilly, Harris, Wilson, Bennett, Williams, Harding, Barnes, Rooney, Kosmina, Ollerton, Sharne, Nyskohus, Maher, Abonyi (Manager Jimmy Shoulder)

Results

In Singapore 
Semi-finals

Third place playoff

Final

In Australia
Group stage

Final

References 

 World of Soccer Cup at TheCelticWiki

1977 in Singaporean sport
1977 in Australian soccer
1977–78 in Scottish football
1977–78 in Yugoslav football
1977–78 in English football
1977
1977